Bahrain competed at the 2019 Military World Games in Wuhan from 18 to 27 October 2019. It sent a delegation consisting of 87 athletes competing in ten sports for the event.

Participants 

Source

Medal summary

Medal by sports

Medalists

References 

Nations at the 2019 Military World Games
2019 in Bahraini sport